Talal Hassan Ali Al-Bloushi (born May 22, 1986 in Kuwait) is a Qatari footballer. who is a retired . He was  a midfielder . and he played for Al Sadd and Al-Shabab and Al Arabi and  Al-Markhiya and the last team was  Mesaimeer and then quit football at the end of 2019.

Al-Bloushi is also a member of the Qatar national football team.

International goals

External links
Player profile at  doha-2006.com

Player profile at QSL.com.qa

1986 births
Living people
Qatari footballers
Qatar international footballers
Qatari expatriate footballers
Al Sadd SC players
Al-Arabi SC (Qatar) players
Al-Markhiya SC players
Mesaimeer SC players
2007 AFC Asian Cup players
2011 AFC Asian Cup players
Qatar Stars League players
Qatari Second Division players
Naturalised citizens of Qatar
Kuwaiti emigrants to Qatar
Qatari people of Kuwaiti descent
Al-Shabab FC (Riyadh) players
Qatari people of Baloch descent
Asian Games medalists in football
Footballers at the 2006 Asian Games
Kuwaiti people of Baloch descent
Saudi Professional League players
Asian Games gold medalists for Qatar
Association football midfielders
Medalists at the 2006 Asian Games
Expatriate footballers in Saudi Arabia
Qatari expatriate sportspeople in Saudi Arabia